Richemont (outdated  ) is a commune in the Moselle department in Grand Est, France. The population is 2,043 as of January 2010.

The localities of the commune are Bévange and Pépinville.

See also 
 Communes of the Moselle department

References

External links 
 

Communes of Moselle (department)